Intertrust may refer to:
 Intertrust Technologies Corporation, a technology development, computing and strategic startup investment company
 Intertrust Group, a trust and corporate services provider